Kirsten Peterman (born ) is a retired Canadian artistic gymnast.
Currently Academic Advisor for Football at the Louisiana State University (LSU), Baton Rouge, LA.

Biography
She was born on 22 February 1998 in Cambridge, Ontario, Canada, to Tim Griffin and Karyn Peterman. Peterman won the vault event at the 2013 International Gymnix and placed third next year at the 2014 International Gymnix. A former member of the Canada women's national artistic gymnastics team, she won a silver medal with her national team at the 2016 Pacific Rim Gymnastics Championships in Everett, where she was the third best Canadian. In March of the same year she was the 10th all-around gymnast at the International Gymnix.

References

1998 births
Living people
Canadian female artistic gymnasts
Sportspeople from Cambridge, Ontario
20th-century Canadian women
21st-century Canadian women